Ñawinpukyu (Quechua ñawi eye, -n a suffix, pukyu spring of water) may refer to:

Lakes
 Ñawinpukyu (Junín), a lake in the Junín Region, Peru 
 Ñawinpukyu (Lima), a lake in the Lima Region, Peru

Places 
 Ñahuimpuquio District, a district in the Huancavelica Region, Peru, and its seat Ñahuimpuquio
 a village in the Junín Region